Final Destination 5 is a 2011 American 3D supernatural horror film directed by Steven Quale and written by Eric Heisserer. It is the fifth installment in the Final Destination film series and a prequel to the first film. Final Destination 5 stars Nicholas D'Agosto, Emma Bell, Miles Fisher, Arlen Escarpeta, David Koechner, and Tony Todd, and follows a young man (played by D'Agosto) who has a premonition and saves a group of people from death when a suspension bridge begins to collapse. However, they soon learn that they cannot escape death.

Despite The Final Destination (2009) being originally announced as the final film in the franchise, due to its financial success, development of Final Destination 5 began in 2010. Filming took place in Vancouver, as with the first three installments.

Final Destination 5 was theatrically released on August 12, 2011, and on DVD on December 27, 2011, by Warner Bros. Pictures and New Line Cinema. The film received mixed reviews from critics, with some critics considered it both a return-to-form for the franchise and an improvement over the previous installment. Reviews criticized the film for failing to bring anything new to the franchise, weak character development, and average dialogue, but also praised the use of 3D, the visual effects, the inventive death scenes, the return of suspense as opposed to a campy feel (particularly both the opening sequence and the twist ending). The film was a financial success, grossing $157 million worldwide against a $40 million budget, becoming the second highest-grossing film in the franchise. A sequel is in development.

Plot 
Sam Lawton is on his way to a company retreat with his colleagues. While their bus crosses the North Bay Bridge, Sam has a premonition that high winds will cause the bridge under construction to collapse, killing everyone except his ex-girlfriend Molly Harper, whom he manages to get across the bridge safely. Panicked, he persuades Molly, his friends Nathan Sears and Peter Friedkin, Peter's girlfriend Candice Hooper, his boss Dennis Lapman, and co-workers Olivia Castle and Isaac Palmer to leave just as the bridge collapses. After being interrogated by FBI agent Jim Block, the survivors attend a memorial service for their deceased co-workers where they are being watched by coroner William Bludworth.

Later, Candice dies during her gym practice from a chain reaction that causes her to fall off the uneven bars and snap her spine. The next day, Isaac's head is crushed by a falling Buddha statue during an acupuncture session at a Chinese spa. Bludworth, who has been present for both deaths, tells the remaining survivors that if they wish to cheat Death, they must kill someone who was never meant to die on the bridge and thereby claim their remaining lifespan. At the same time, Sam and Molly fail to save Olivia, who falls out of a window to her death at an eye surgery clinic. Sam learns that the survivors are dying in the order they were meant to die on the bridge and realizes that Nathan is next.

Nathan, who has returned to the factory, accidentally kills his co-worker Roy Carson during an argument. He relays this information to the remaining survivors, who believe that Nathan must have claimed Roy's remaining lifespan. When Dennis arrives to question the incident, a wrench launched by a belt sander splits his face, killing him. That evening, Sam and Molly rekindle their relationship at the restaurant where the former is working. Peter, who has become unstable after Candice's death, interrupts the date and decides to kill Molly to take her lifespan. After Peter draws a gun, Sam and Molly both escape to the kitchen as Block overhears the gunshots from outside and enters the restaurant, only to be shot dead by Peter. The former attempts to kill Molly and Sam to eliminate witnesses, but Sam kills Peter with a meat spit to save Molly.

Two weeks later, Sam and Molly board a plane to Paris. Before taking their seats, they notice a fight between Carter Horton and Alex Browning, who are both removed from the plane with Ms. Lewton and the other students, revealing that the plane they are boarding is Volée Airlines Flight 180. Upon take-off, Sam overhears Alex's vision from a flight attendant's conversation with a passenger. When he realizes that it is too late for him and Molly to escape, both of them perish along with everyone else on the plane in the explosion that follows. At Roy's memorial, Nathan learns from a co-worker about Roy's autopsy and the discovery of his brain aneurysm that would have resulted in his death in a short time anyway. As the co-worker leaves the bar, the landing gear from the plane breaks through the roof and crushes him.

Cast

Production

Development 

Alan Horn, the head of Warner Bros., confirmed at ShoWest in March 2010 that Final Destination 5 was in works at ShoWest. Producer Craig Perry later added that the film would be shot in 3D. Eric Heisserer was announced as screenwriter in April 2010. The studio initially picked August 26, 2011, as the release date, but later changed it to August 12, 2011. In June 2010, New Line Cinema announced that Steven Quale would direct, and that the movie would be renamed 5nal Destination. The name change was reversed only a few months later.

Writing 
According to Heisserer, Final Destination 5 was always meant to be a prequel, set before the first film; the idea having come from franchise producer Craig Perry. Heisserer said that one major problem he encountered while writing the film was coming up with good death sequences, believing that managing to do so in the world of Final Destination is "ridiculously hard". The inspiration for Olivia's death sequence involving LASIK eye surgery came after his wife underwent the same type of surgery.

Casting 
In August 2010, actor and musician Miles Fisher was the first to be cast in the film as Peter Friedkin. Fisher had appeared in numerous short films and in a small role in the comedy film Superhero Movie (2008). Fisher said during an interview that "I've done a little bit of television and a little bit of film, but 3-D is almost an entirely different sport." Three days after Fisher's casting, Arlen Escarpeta was cast in the film as Nathan Sears. Escarpeta explained that "I think what they're going to do really, really well this time around, they're going to go back—the story, the plot, a lot of stuff is really going to matter, I think the last movie it was just death. It was death, death, death, which is fine because that's what people want to see. But this time we're going to give them a little bit of everything – good story, great director—it's going to be good."

In late August 2010, Nicholas D'Agosto was cast to portray the film's main visionary Sam Lawton. D'Agosto had recently starred in the 2007 comedy film Rocket Science before he was cast in the film after his appearance in Fired Up! since 2009. Along with D'Agosto, newcomer actress Ellen Wroe joined the cast as Candice Hooper. One day later, Tony Todd, who portrayed William Bludworth from the first two installments, returned to join the film's cast after not appearing in the fourth film due to scheduling commitments to work on Transformers: Revenge of the Fallen. On August 30, 2010, the production hired David Koechner and P. J. Byrne to join the cast. Koechner portrays the characters' company executive Dennis Lapman while Byrne, after his appearance in Dinner for Schmucks, portrays Isaac Palmer. Emma Bell, who made her major film debut appearance in the 2010 thriller film Frozen, was cast on September 2 to co-lead with D'Agosto as Molly Harper. In mid-September, both Courtney B. Vance and Jacqueline MacInnes Wood are the last main cast members to join the film. Law & Order: Criminal Intent's Vance plays FBI agent Jim Block while Wood, who is starring as Steffy Forrester in the soap opera The Bold and the Beautiful, portrays co-worker Olivia Castle.

Filming 

Location filming returned to Vancouver, where parts of the first three films were shot. Principal photography took place between September 13 and December 14, 2010. Producers stated that this installment would be darker and more suspenseful in the style of the original film. Final Destination 3 star Chelan Simmons revealed that the opening scene would be filmed on the Lions Gate Bridge in Vancouver.

Music

Soundtrack 
The soundtrack to Final Destination 5 was released on August 16, 2011, by Varèse Sarabande, four days after the release of the film. The soundtrack contains 19 tracks composed by Brian Tyler, music composer of The Final Destination. It is also the second Final Destination soundtrack album to be released. Miles Fisher also released a tie-in video for his single "New Romance" which features the key actors in the film in a Saved by the Bell parody in which most are killed in freak accidents, in keeping with the series.

Commercial songs from the film, but not on the soundtrack
 "I Will Buy You a New Life" by Everclear
 "Successful Leader" by Jeff Tymoschuk
 "Ballroom" and "Girl on the Run" by Terry Poison
 "Dust in the Wind" by Kansas
 "Walk Like Water" by Cliff P. deMarks, Jr.
 "Me, Myself and I" by Excellence
 "The Orbiting Suns" by Jens Gad
 "If You Want Blood (You've Got It)" by AC/DC

Score 
The album contains 19 cues composed by Brian Tyler and performed by the Slovak National Symphony Orchestra, omitting commercially released songs that were featured in the film. It is first and only film in the series not to use original themes by Shirley Walker from the previous films.

 "Main Title" (3:47)
 "Fates Bridge" (6:31)
 "Repercussions" (4:06)
 "Kill or Be Killed" (4:30)
 "Cheating Death" (2:13)
 "Bludworth" (2:43)
 "Death's Work" (10:12)
 "Olivia" (1:35)
 "Eye Can't See No Good" (4:16)
 "The Gift Certificate" (2:50)
 "Meet the Gang" (1:10)
 "Hook in Mouth" (2:09)
 "Isaac's Got a Point" (2:08)
 "Recognition" (0:59)
 "Mystery" (2:47)
 "Bend Over Backwards" (4:38)
 "The Order of Death" (7:20)
 "Plans Within Plans" (3:45)
 "Infinite Finale" (1:31)

Release

Marketing 
The Advertising Standards Authority (ASA) in the UK ruled that the original theatrical poster, which had been used on buses and trains during the summer, "was likely to cause fear and undue distress to children". It ruled that the advert must not appear in the original form again.

Warner Bros. countered by stating that the poster "accurately reflected the content of the film in an appropriate manner without causing excessive fear or distress". They also added that the poster's dark grey and black colors were "unlikely to engage the attention of young children", and that the "surreal" image did not feature people, blood or display any real-life violence.

The ASA, which had received 13 complaints, with three stating that their children (aged between 1 and 3) had been upset, ruled "We considered the image was likely to catch the attention of children, especially because it was shown on a poster on the Underground, where it was an untargeted medium. Because very young children might view this ad depicting violence, it was likely to cause fear and undue distress to children."

Box office 
Final Destination 5 ranked #3 at the weekend box office with $18.4 million behind Rise of the Planet of the Apes ($27.5 million), which held the top spot for two weeks, and The Help ($25.5 million). It was also the third biggest Final Destination opening to date behind 2009's The Final Destination ($27.4 million) and 2006's Final Destination 3 ($19.1 million). Final Destination 5 grossed $42,587,643 domestically, and $115,300,000 internationally, for a worldwide total of $157,887,643, becoming the second-highest-grossing film in the franchise.

Home media 
Final Destination 5 was released on DVD and Blu-ray Disc on December 27, 2011. The Blu-ray Disc comes in two forms: the movie only edition and the Blu-ray Disc/DVD/UltraViolet edition. A Blu-ray 3D edition was released exclusively through Best Buy. The film was released in the UK on December 26, 2011; however, only the special edition Blu-ray Disc contained the 3D cut of the film. An UltraViolet copy was available in all formats.

Before the film appeared in theaters, Fisher released a music video. Starring the main cast of Final Destination 5 and featuring Fisher's original song "New Romance", the video parodied the 1990s sitcom Saved by the Bell and included a clue to the plot of the film. Fisher, a fan of the show, and video director Dave Green watched every episode, and contemporary shows like Boy Meets World and Clarissa Explains It All. "We thought, 'Gosh wouldn't it be fun and subversive to have Final Destination-type deaths in this safe, [sitcom] world?'" Fisher, who plays a Zack Morris-type character, said. He joked, "I basically have always been looking for a way to dance with Kelly Kapowski my whole life".

Reception

Critical response 
Review aggregator Rotten Tomatoes reports that 62% of 137 critic reviews are positive, and the average rating is 5.9 out of 10. The site's critical consensus reads, "It's still only for the gore-thirsty faithful, but Final Destination 5 represents a surprising return to form for the franchise." Metacritic, which assigns a weighted score, gives the film a score of 50 out of 100, based on 24 critics, indicating "mixed or average reviews". It is the highest-rated film of the franchise on both sites. Audiences polled by CinemaScore gave the film an average grade of "B+" on an A+ to F scale.

Richard Roeper stated in his review "From the opening credits to the final kill this film displays a great use of 3-D." Todd Gilchrist of Boxoffice Magazine has declared the film in his review for being "the best 3D horror movie ever made." He described Final Destination 5 as "a clean, glossy thriller shot in native 3D (not post-conversion) that maximizes the technology without straining the audience's credulity or their constitutions." He also stated "Calling anything the 'best 3D horror film' has the ring of crowning the world's tallest midget, but Quale uses 3D almost shockingly well." In a review for Toronto.com, Linda Barnard has stated "this could be a case where the 3-D-shot movie is worth the extra few bucks to see".

The visual effects were praised for improving on the weak CGI from the previous installment. Betty Jo Tucker of ReelTalk Movie Reviews said in her review "The film boasts some of the best visual effects ever, especially the bridge-crumbling sequence at the beginning of the film." In his review of Final Destination 5, Roger Ebert said "... the special effects do an excellent job of beheading, incinerating, vivisecting, squishing and so on." "Final Destination 5 contain some of the most fun effects ever seen that purely enhance the thrills and bloody spills, rather than detract from them," stated Lisa Giles-Keddie from uk.real.com.

The death scenes in the film have been praised as being suspenseful, creative, and shocking. Boxoffice Magazine said in praise, "viewers connect to both the relatable pain of everyday injury and the gory gratification of a well-constructed, larger-than-life set piece." NJ.com opined, "Admitted, there is a certain inventiveness to the way director Steven Quale stages the violence." San Francisco Chronicle said that the characters are "killed in gruesome and spectacular ways". The gymnastic set piece has been praised as "anxiety-filled", "a beautiful example of successful comic suspense", "Hitchcockian edge-of-your-seat suspense", and "inventively grotesque". Film.com stated in their review "The subsequent deaths are hit-or-miss, but they all show some creative spark. Quale sets them up like a cross between a joke and a magic trick, carefully establishing crucial details."

The opening bridge collapse has garnered considerable critical acclaim, with many stating it as being on par with the pile-up sequence from Final Destination 2. It has been said to be "one of the single best sequences of any film all year" by Boxoffice Magazine. Uk.real.com stated that the opening bridge collapse sequence is "beautifully directed and choreographed". Eric D. Snider has stated in his review for Film.com that "The opening premonition is nerve-janglingly effective." New York Post called the bridge collapse sequence "spectacular", and Daily News deemed it "terrifying". USA Today commented on the sequence, saying "The effect is terrific and reminiscent of the bridge destruction from Mission: Impossible III." Betsy Sharkey, a Los Angeles Times film critic stated in her negative review "I will say, the bus, and the bridge it must cross, does make for a pretty incredible wham-bam opening sequence," and further added "The big crumble is a stunner of an opener." In a review for MSN.com, Kat Murphy said "the fifth chapter starts out with a slambang catastrophe", then stated that the bridge collapse is "skillfully orchestrated", and "this sequence is actually enhanced by 3-D: Holes in the disintegrating bridge seem to pull the gaze down—dizzyingly—to the river below, and jagged camera angles on hanging railings and sliding debris muddle our sense of what's up, what's down." Kirk Honeycutt of The Hollywood Reporter praised "This film's opening sequence is undeniably spectacular." Aaron Hillis from The Village Voice called the bridge collapse "breathtakingly staged". The Advocate stated that "Director Steve Quale and writer Heisserer stage the bridge's collapse in swift but exacting detail." The Austin Chronicle said  the bridge collapse sequence is "spectacularly gruesome".

In 2017, John Squires, writing for Bloody Disgusting, gave five reasons as to why Final Destination 5 is the franchise's best sequel; highlighting the opening sequence, the inventive death scenes, the level of gore in the film, the new mythology to defeat Death and the ending encompassing scenes with the first film.

Future 

In early 2011, Tony Todd said in an interview with Dread Central that if Final Destination 5 was a success at the box office, then two sequels would be filmed back-to-back. On August 23, when asked whether he would be directing a sequel, Steven Quale elaborated: "Who knows. Never say never. I mean, it'll be up to the fans. We'll see how this one performs internationally, and if it makes as much money as the fourth one, I'm sure Warner Brothers will want to make another one".

In January 2019, a new installment was announced to be in development, from Warner Bros. Pictures and New Line Cinema. Patrick Melton and Marcus Dunstan will write the script, with the plot described as a "re-imagining" of the franchise. In August, Devon Sawa expressed interest in returning to the franchise in the reboot.

In March 2020, the film was revealed to be set in the same canon as the first five films and would focus on first responders, with series producer Craig Perry stating: "We're toying with having it take place in the world of first responders: EMTs, firemen, and police. These people deal with death on the front lines every day and make choices that can cause people to live or die. We rely on their good judgment, expertise, and calm demeanor. So why not put those people in the nightmare situation where every choice can bring about life and death – but now for themselves? We're thinking that world might be an interesting way into a Final Destination movie, and one which can also generate unique set pieces in a very credible way".

Later in October, series creator Jeffrey Reddick confirmed that a sixth film had been in the works prior to the COVID-19 pandemic.

References

External links 

 
 
 
 

2011 films
2011 3D films
2011 horror films
2010s supernatural horror films
American teen horror films
American supernatural horror films
Films about aviation accidents or incidents
Films scored by Brian Tyler
Films directed by Steven Quale
Films about death
Films set in 2000
Films set in the United States
Films set on airplanes
Films shot in Vancouver
Final Destination films
IMAX films
New Line Cinema films
Warner Bros. films
2010s English-language films
2010s American films
American prequel films
Bridge disasters in popular culture